The Grandins' Mayville Farm District in Mayville, North Dakota is a farm that was developed before 1900 by the Grandin brothers.  It includes Queen Anne style architecture in the United States.  It was listed on the National Register of Historic Places in 1985.  It then included eight contributing buildings and a contributing structure on its .

References

Farms on the National Register of Historic Places in North Dakota
Queen Anne architecture in North Dakota
1900 establishments in North Dakota
Historic districts on the National Register of Historic Places in North Dakota
National Register of Historic Places in Traill County, North Dakota